The Hugh W. and Sarah Sample House is a historic building located in Keokuk, Iowa, United States. Hugh Sample became the mayor of Keokuk in 1858 and had the house built the following year. He lived in the residence until his death in 1870. The 2½-story structure was designed in the Italianate style and is considered the finest and most intact example of that style in Keokuk. It follows an irregular plan and features tall narrow windows capped with elaborated crowns, a low pitch gabled roof, and wide bracketed eaves. At one time the house had an ornate cupola. The rooms on the interior have  ceilings The house was listed on the National Register of Historic Places in 1995.

References

Houses completed in 1859
Italianate architecture in Iowa
Houses in Keokuk, Iowa
Houses on the National Register of Historic Places in Iowa
National Register of Historic Places in Lee County, Iowa